CNF may refer to:

 Cloud-Native Network Function, emerging technology in cloud computing
 Belo Horizonte International Airport, Brazil, IATA code CNF
 Chomsky normal form, in formal language theory, first described by Noam Chomsky
 Configuration file, in computing, typically with file extension .cnf, .conf, .cfg, .cf, or .ini
 Conjunctive normal form, also known as clausal normal form, in Boolean logic
 Constant weight without fins, a freediving discipline in which usage of fins or change of ballast is prohibited

Organizations 
 Caucasus Nature Fund, a German non-profit supporting protected areas in Transcaucasia
 Club Nacional de Football, Uruguayan football team
 Comité National Français, a provisional government of Free France led by Charles de Gaulle
 Commonwealth Naval Forces, former name of the Royal Australian Navy
 Cornell NanoScale Science and Technology Facility, at Cornell University, member of the National Nanotechnology Coordinated Infrastructure

Science 
 Carbon nanofiber, cylindrical nanostructures with graphene layers
 Cellulose nanofibre,  a type of nanocellulose
 Cytotoxic necrotising factor family, members of which are referred to as CNF followed by a number
 Cyanogen fluoride, a cyanide compound with the chemical formula CNF